The NORCECA Men's Junior Continental Championship U-21 is a volleyball competition for national teams, currently held biannually and organized by the NORCECA, the North America, Central America and Caribbean volleyball federation. The competition is played by men's under-21 teams.

History

Medal table

See also
Women's Junior NORCECA Volleyball Championship

NORCECA Volleyball Championship
Men's NORCECA Volleyball Championship
V